Crypsotidia inquirenda is a moth of the family Erebidae. It is found in Tanzania and Zambia.

References

Moths described in 1909
Crypsotidia